Clairin is a distilled alcoholic spirit made from sugarcane produced in Haiti, that undergoes the same distillation process as rhum. 

There are between 500 and 600 micro-distilleries in Haiti, compared to fewer than 50 in total throughout the rest of the Caribbean. The distilleries are artisan productions: most of them are small shacks dotted around the countryside producing for the consumption of their own villages.

Clairin is made from indigenous cane varieties, non-hybridized, with no chemical interference in the agriculture. They are spontaneously fermented with no yeast selected, distillation techniques from the mid-18th century, and no filtration.

See also
Rhum agricole
Haitian cuisine
Tafia

References

Distilled drinks
Haitian distilled drinks
Haitian alcoholic drinks
Haitian cuisine
Saccharum